The men's 110 metres hurdles event at the 1983 Summer Universiade was held at the Commonwealth Stadium in Edmonton, Canada on 10 and 11 July 1983.

Medalists

Results

Heats

Wind:Heat 1: +1.7 m/s, Heat 2: +0.4 m/s, Heat 3: +2.4 m/s

Final

Wind: +0.3 m/s

References

Athletics at the 1983 Summer Universiade
1983